Yeferson Paz Blandón (born 13 June 2002) is a Colombian professional  footballer who plays as a defender for  club Perugia, on loan from Sassuolo.

Career

Paz started his career with Colombian second tier side Cortuluá. Before the second half of 2020–21, he signed for Sassuolo in the Italian Serie A.

In 2022, Paz was sent on loan to Italian second tier club Perugia. On 5 August 2022, he debuted for Perugia during a 2–3 loss to Cagliari.

References

External links

  

2002 births
A.C. Perugia Calcio players
Association football defenders
Expatriate footballers in Italy
Categoría Primera B players
Colombia youth international footballers
Colombian expatriate footballers
Colombian expatriate sportspeople in Italy
Colombian footballers
Cortuluá footballers
Living people
Serie B players
U.S. Sassuolo Calcio players